Bahna may refer to:

Romania
Bahna, a commune in Neamț County
Bahna, a village in Pârgărești Commune, Bacău County
Bahna, a village in Ilovița Commune, Mehedinți County
Bahna, a tributary of the Buhai in Botoșani County
Bahna, a tributary of the Ciunca in Iași County
Bahna (Danube), a tributary of the Danube in Mehedinți County

Ukraine 
Bahna, Ukraine